Richborough Castle is a Roman Saxon Shore fort better known as Richborough Roman Fort. It is situated in Richborough near Sandwich, Kent. Substantial remains of the massive fort walls still stand to a height of several metres.

It is part of a larger Roman town called Rutupiae or Portus Ritupis that developed around the fort and the associated port. The settlement was founded after Roman conquest of Britain of Britain in AD 43. Because of its position near to a large natural harbour in the Wantsum Channel and to the mouth of the Stour, Rutupiae served as a main gateway to Roman Britain and the starting point for the road now known as Watling Street. The site is now two and half miles inland from the current coastline.

Earth fortifications were first dug on the site in the 1st century, probably for a storage depot and bridgehead for the Roman army. The site expanded into a major civilian and commercial town, and the stone Saxon Shore fort was added around the year 277.  The later fort is believed to have been constructed by the rebel Carausius. The site is now under the care of English Heritage.

Etymology

The meaning of the name Rutupiae is uncertain, although the first element may derive from the British Celtic *rutu- meaning "rust; mud" (cf. Welsh rhwd). An alternative attested name for the fort, Ritupiae, may represent a clearer British form, containing the word *ritus "ford" (Welsh rhyd), referring to a crossing point between the then island and the mainland. The meaning of the -piae element remains unknown.

History

Roman Invasion

Richborough was probably the landing site for the Claudian invasion in 43 AD as the first defensive barrier dating from this period has been discovered at the site in the form of twin V-shaped ditches of at least 650 m length and parallel to the Roman coastline. These would have protected the invasion beachhead and supply depot. The crossing would have exploited one of the shortest routes over the English Channel. However, other explicit details on the site of the Claudian invasion have not survived and its location is a matter of scholarly debate.

In Roman times the broad Wantsum Channel separated the Isle of Thanet from mainland Britain and Rutupiae is thought to have guarded the channel.

Civilian town

As the fighting moved north, Rutupiae became an increasingly large supply base for the army and later a civilian settlement.
 
The town was most prosperous in the 2nd century when the timber mansio, a guest house for visiting officials, first built in 100, was rebuilt in stone. Geophysical and aerial surveys have shown that the settlement extended over an area of at least 21 ha. There were temples and an amphitheatre.

However, Richborough was widely regarded throughout the Roman Empire for the quality of its oysters. They are mentioned as on a par with those from the Italian Lucrine Lake in Juvenal. "Rutupine shore" was used as a common metonymy for Britain in Latin writers.

Triumphal arch

A major quadrifrons triumphal arch, one of the biggest in the Roman Empire, was erected in about AD 85 straddling Watling Street, the main road from Richborough to London.  Its position and size suggest it may have been built to celebrate the final conquest of Britain after Agricola’s victory at the Battle of Mons Graupius.
Standing as it did between the port and the province, passage through the arch signified formal entry into Britannia (cf the similarly maritime Arch of Trajan at Ancona). Only the foundations and mound of the Richborough arch are still visible. It was demolished by the Romans themselves, apparently to provide building materials for the later Saxon Shore fort on the site.

Saxon Shore fort

During the late 3rd century this (by now large) civilian town was re-militarised by the conversion of part of it into a so-called Saxon Shore fort, a series of forts built by the Romans along the Channel on the English and French coasts possibly to guard against invading Saxon pirates. Construction of the fort here is believed to have started in 277 and been completed in 285. This involved the demolition and reuse as spolia of the triumphal arch, and numismatic evidence suggests it occurred during the reign of Carausius.

However, the north and south walls were constructed differently. The north wall was built by separate gangs of labourers, while the south wall seems to have been built as a single unit, suggesting that the north wall was built after the south wall. In some places, the walls reached over 25 feet (8 m) in height, and were built of small ashlar and double-tile courses. The main entrance of the fort was in the west wall. The walls stand to a great height and were of such high quality that they only recently needed repointing.

In the interior of the fort most buildings were of timber though some were stone. A stone central rectangular building was probably the principia (headquarters) and there were also small, stone-built baths.

Amphitheatre

An amphitheatre has been visible as a hummock 5 minutes' walk from the main site. It had a capacity of 5000 spectators. Excavations in 2021 have revealed that the amphitheatre and the settlement are likely to have continued in use from the invasion to the end of Roman rule in the early 5th century. Vivid red and blue paint was found on the arena wall, the first for any Roman amphitheatre in Britain. A room, or cell, with walls almost 2 m high, used to hold wild animals, criminals or gladiators before entry in the arena was also found.

Church at Richborough

There exists an unexplained structure at Richborough that is believed to be a font.  Today, this structure is almost entirely destroyed.  The hexagonal font discovered during the excavations at Richborough suggests that baptisms could have been a function of this church.  The church was probably built at the end of the 4th century or at the beginning of the 5th century.  It seems plausible that the church was built of wood.

Roman withdrawal

During the decline of the Roman Empire, Richborough was eventually abandoned by the Romans and the site was later occupied by a Saxon religious settlement.

Excavations

In 1849 excavations on the amphitheatre discovered a skeleton suggesting the site later became a cemetery.  

Excavations continued in 1900.

Further major excavations were made in 1922-38 by J.P. Bushe-Fox.

Excavations carried out in late 2008 of a  section of Roman wall uncovered the original Roman coastline along with the remains of a medieval dock.

Excavations from 2021 have focussed on the amphitheatre situated 300 m south west of the fort.

In popular culture

Author Russell Hoban repurposes Richborough Castle as "Roaming Rune" alluding to its Roman origins in his 1980, post apocalyptic novel Riddley Walker.

References

External links 

  Richborough Roman Fort page at English Heritage
'Gateway to Britannia' on Google Arts & Culture

Ancient Roman triumphal arches
Archaeological sites in Kent
Buildings and structures in Kent
Dover District
English Heritage sites in Kent
Roman fortifications in England
Roman towns and cities in England
Saxon Shore forts
40s establishments in the Roman Empire
Populated places established in the 1st century
Grade I listed buildings in Kent
Former populated places in Kent
1st-century establishments in Roman Britain
Ruins in Kent
Roman auxiliary forts in England